Southwold is a township in Elgin County, in Ontario, Canada, located on the north shore of Lake Erie.  It is a rich agricultural zone producing predominantly corn and soybeans.  It is part of the London census metropolitan area.

History

The Southwold Earthworks is located in the township. It is an example of a pre-contact site associated with the indigenous Neutral people. The period of Neutral occupation is dated to approximately 14501550. It was designated as a National Historic Site in 1923.

Southwold was named in 1792 after Southwold in Suffolk, England.  The municipality was incorporated in 1852.

Shedden's growth occurred when the Canada Southern Railway was built, bypassing Fingal.  Later it was joined by the Pere Marquette railway, boosting Shedden's importance further still.  Both railways are now defunct.  Talbotville is situated at the intersection of highways 3 & 4, two of the oldest roads in the region.

Southwold was the site of the 2006 Shedden massacre.

Economy
The township is home to the Green Lane Landfill, a large garbage dump site purchased by the City of Toronto in 2007.  Toronto began shipping waste to the site in 2010.  Southwold was also home of the Ford St. Thomas Assembly plant until its closure in 2011.

Communities
Fingal
 Iona
Iona Station
 Paynes Mills
Shedden
 Talbotville Royal

Demographics 

See also
List of townships in Ontario

References

External links 

Township municipalities in Ontario
Lower-tier municipalities in Ontario
Municipalities in Elgin County